Cray Parish Church, also known as Cray Free Church and Kirkmichael Free Church, is a former Church of Scotland church in Cray, Perth and Kinross, Scotland. It is located in Kirkmichael parish, on the north side of the B951, which forms part of the -long Cateran Trail.

Built in 1844, it is a Category C listed building. Highbury House, the former manse, built in 1845, stands immediately to the southwest of the church. The church tower was added, with a pyramid slated roof, in 1864. Two years later, the manse was extended.

Gallery

See also

List of listed buildings in Kirkmichael, Perth and Kinross

References

External links
 The church building and Highbury House from the road – Google Street View, October 2016
Cray Church of Scotland – Canmore

Category C listed buildings in Perth and Kinross
Listed churches in Scotland
Churches in Perth and Kinross
Cray
1844 establishments in Scotland
Former churches in Scotland